Commelina mascarenica is a monocotyledonous, herbaceous plant in the dayflower family from East Africa. This pale blue-flowered herb is found in a variety of open habitats from open bush to roadsides. Although the species was originally thought to be restricted to Madagascar and the Comoro Islands, further study revealed that the species is also widely distributed along the East African coast from Somalia south to Mozambique. It had formerly been confused with the closely related species Commelina imberbis and Commelina lukei, the latter occurring alongside C. mascarenica throughout much of its range.

References

Mascarenica
Flora of Kenya
Flora of Tanzania
Flora of Madagascar
Taxa named by Charles Baron Clarke